Bomnak is a rural locality (a selo) in Zeysky District of Amur Oblast, Russia, located on the northern bank of Zeya Reservoir.

Transportation
A local road leads west to Gorny and Verkhnezeysk.

Climate
Bomnak has a dry-winter subarctic climate (Köppen climate classification Dwc) with dry, bitterly cold winters and warm, wet summers.

References

Rural localities in Zeysky District